Hugues Occansey (born 18 December 1966 in Moyeuvre-Grande, France) is a French basketball player who played 83 times for the men's French national basketball team between 1985 and 1995.

References

1966 births
Living people
People from Moyeuvre-Grande
French men's basketball players
French expatriate basketball people in Greece
French expatriate basketball people in Spain
Limoges CSP coaches
Liga ACB players
Limoges CSP players
Montpellier Paillade Basket players
Peristeri B.C. players
SIG Basket players
Valencia Basket players
Sportspeople from Moselle (department)
Small forwards